The 1985 CFL Draft composed of nine rounds where 81 Canadian football players were chosen from eligible Canadian universities and Canadian players playing in the NCAA. The 1985 draft was the first draft in Canadian Football League history wherein there were no territorial exemptions provided for teams to only draft players from the region in Canada where they were located.

1st round
1. Ottawa Rough Riders                               Nicholas Benjamin            OL             Concordia

2. Calgary Stampeders                                Randy Ambrosie               OL        Manitoba

3. British Columbia Lions                            John Ulmer                   DE      North Dakota

4. Montreal Concordes                                Tony Johnson                 TB        Henderson State

5. Edmonton Eskimos                                  Peter Emsky                  OL        Washington State

6. Winnipeg Blue Bombers                             Pat Langdon                  TE        Tennessee

7. British Columbia Lions                                Rick Ryan                    DB         Weber State

8. Hamilton Tiger-Cats                               Jed Tommy                    TB         Guelph

9. Winnipeg Blue Bombers                                 Robert Molle                    DE         Simon Fraser

2nd round
10. Ottawa Rough Riders                                  Tom Munroe                   WR     British Columbia

11. Calgary Stampeders                                   Garrett Doll                 LB         Alberta

12. Saskatchewan Roughriders  David Conrad       TE  Acadia

13. Montreal Concordes                                   Scott Robson                 C          North Dakota

14. British Columbia Lions                               Bruce Barnett                DB         British Columbia

15. Calgary Stampeders                                   Tom Spoltenini               T          Calgary

16. British Columbia Lions                               Joe Pariselli                TB         York

17. Hamilton Tiger-Cats  Lance Thompson            LB         Carleton

18. Winnipeg Blue Bombers                                Derron Vernon                TB         Eastern Michigan

3rd round
19. Ottawa Rough Riders                                  Neri Fratin                  TB       Ottawa

20. Calgary Stampeders                                   Wes Cooper                   TB           Weber State

21. Saskatchewan Roughriders                             Gerald Lashyn                LB        Saskatchewan

22. British Columbia Lions                               Bob Jedicke                  DL      Western Ontario

23. Edmonton Eskimos                                     Mark Horvath                 DB          McMaster

24. Toronto Argonauts                                Don Adamic                   OL          British Columbia

25. Edmonton Eskimos                                     Renzo Passaretti             LB  Saint Mary's

26. British Columbia Lions                               Chris Spence  TB  Simon Fraser

27. Winnipeg Blue Bombers                                Rob Prodanovic               DL          Calgary

4th round
28. Saskatchewan Roughriders  Tony Dennis                  WR          Simon Fraser

29. Calgary Stampeders                                   Scott Bissessar              WR         Queen's

30. Saskatchewan Roughriders                             Lloyd Clefstad               DT          Simon Fraser

31. Montreal Concordes  Mike O'Donnell               QB          Manitoba

32. Edmonton Eskimos                                     Clorindo Grilli              TB          McMaster

33. Toronto Argonauts                                    Kristen Keillor              T  Wilfrid Laurier

34. British Columbia Lions                               Kurt Wilchuck                LB         Oregon

35. Ottawa Rough Riders                                  Marty Palazeti               DE         Marshall

36. Hamilton Tiger-Cats                                  Dale Sanderson               C            Tennessee

5th round
37. Saskatchewan Roughriders  Steve Crane                 DB            Acadia

38. Calgary Stampeders  Terry Cochrane              TB            British Columbia

39. Saskatchewan Roughriders                             Rob Bresciani               WR            Saskatchewan

40. Montreal Concordes                                   Bloyce Bulman               DE  Mount Allison

41. Edmonton Eskimos                                     Tom Richards                TB            Alberta

42. Toronto Argonauts                                    Dan Petschenig              OL            Carleton

43. British Columbia Lions                               John Moffatt                WR            Western Ontario

44. Hamilton Tiger-Cats  Glen Miller                 SB            McGill

45. Winnipeg Blue Bombers                                Glenn Steele                TB            British Columbia

6th round
46. Ottawa Rough Riders                                  Lance Chomyc               K/P  Toronto

47. Calgary Stampeders                                   Joe Mahnic                  TB            Saskatchewan

48. Saskatchewan Roughriders                             Jerry Nash                  DB            Alberta

49. Montreal Concordes                                   Mark Clatney                DT  Moorhead State

50. Edmonton Eskimos                                     Harold Riemer               OL            Alberta

51. Toronto Argonauts                                    Alex Troop                  LB            Wilfrid Laurier

52. British Columbia Lions                               Chester Krala               LB            Calgary

53. Hamilton Tiger-Cats                                  Lance Harry                 G             Concordia

54. Winnipeg Blue Bombers  Greg Miller               LB            Concordia

7th round
55. Ottawa Rough Riders                                  George Ganas                TB            York

56. Calgary Stampeders                                   Roger DesLauriers           DB            British Columbia

57. Saskatchewan Roughriders                             Mark Urness                  G  Boise State

58. Montreal Concordes                                   Donovan Brown                DB             York

59. Edmonton Eskimos                                     Bill Starke                  WR             Western Ontario

60. Toronto Argonauts                                    Andy Filipuik                WR             Toronto

61. Winnipeg Blue Bombers  Doug Campbell            LB             Alberta

62. Hamilton Tiger-Cats                                  John Lepore                  TB             Guelph

63. Winnipeg Blue Bombers                                Randy Saunders               TE             Simon Fraser

8th round
64. Ottawa Rough Riders                                  Morris Elfenbaum             OL             Minot State

65. Calgary Stampeders                                   James Whute                  WR             Simon Fraser

66. Saskatchewan Roughriders                             Roger Mayer                  DL             Concordia

67. Montreal Concordes                                   David Binkle                 LB  Panhandle State

68. Edmonton Eskimos                                     Dana Donald                  DB              Alberta

69. Toronto Argonauts                                    Nolan Duke                   C               Wilfrid Laurier

70. British Columbia Lions  John Melvin               DL              British Columbia

71. Hamilton Tiger-Cats                                  Brian Bone                   WR              Western Ontario

72. Winnipeg Blue Bombers                                Randy Fabi                   WR              Western Ontario

9th round
73. Ottawa Rough Riders                                  Craig Keenan                 QB      Colorado

74. Calgary Stampeders                                   Robin Simpson                OL               Calgary

75. Saskatchewan Roughriders                             Colum Armstrong              K                Acadia

76. Montreal Concordes                                   Denis Boisclair              K/P       Illinois

77. Edmonton Eskimos  Mike McLean                  LB                Alberta

78. Toronto Argonauts                                    Kevin Reaume                 TE    St. Francis Xavier

79. British Columbia Lions                               Bob Ros                      TE               British Columbia

80. Hamilton Tiger-Cats  Sean McKenna                LB               McMaster

81. Winnipeg Blue Bombers                                Ron St. Mars                 LB               Manitoba

References
Canadian Draft

Canadian College Draft
Cfl Draft, 1985